Cartman is a surname. Notable people with the surname include: 

 William Cartman (1861–1935), English first-class cricketer
 Bert Cartman (1900–1955), English footballer

See also
 Cartman (disambiguation)